Vakil was one of the highest positions in the hierarchy of Safavid Iran, denoting the viceroy in the administrative and some religious affairs of the realm.

References

Sources 
 
 

Government of Safavid Iran